David Enrique Allende Paez (born 15 May 1986) was a Chilean footballer. His last club was Trasandino, then Tercera División de Chile side.

Honours

Player
San Marcos de Arica
 Tercera División de Chile (1): 2007

References

External links
 
 

1986 births
Living people
Chilean footballers
Trasandino footballers
Magallanes footballers
San Marcos de Arica footballers
Primera B de Chile players
Association football defenders
People from Los Andes Province, Chile